The 2020–21 ISU Challenger Series was scheduled to be held from September 9 to December 5, 2020. It was the seventh season that the ISU Challenger Series, a group of senior-level international figure skating competitions ranked below the ISU Grand Prix, was held. Originally a series of ten events, the 2020–21 Challenger Series featured only two individual events, with six events cancelled and two postponed to an unknown future date due to the COVID-19 pandemic.

Impact of the COVID-19 pandemic 
The International Skating Union announcement on April 22, 2020 for the 2020–21 ISU Challenger Series issued the following caveat regarding the scheduling of the events:

On May 1, the ISU established a working group, chaired by ISU Vice-President for Figure Skating Alexander Lakernik, to monitor the ongoing COVID-19 pandemic. Its responsibilities include determining the feasibility of holding events as scheduled, possibly behind closed doors, during the first half of the 2020–21 season and the financial impact of any potential cancellations.

On May 16, the Slovak Figure Skating Association informed the ISU that it had cancelled all upcoming events that it was scheduled to host due to the ongoing pandemic, including the 2020 Nepela Memorial in Bratislava.

As of May 26, the initial event schedule announced for the 2020 Asian Open Trophy has been withdrawn. As of July 21, Skate Canada marked the 2020 Autumn Classic as postponed to an unspecified date.

On July 13, the ISU announced that the 2020–21 Challenger Series events would be regarded as separate individual competitions, rather than as a series; as a result, no Challenger Series ranking will be determined and no prize money will be distributed at the end of the series. However, skaters competing will earn Challenger Series-level points for their World Ranking, as long as the competition meets ISU guidelines to qualify as a Challenger event. The decision was later revised by the ISU council on August 3, announcing that World Standing/Ranking points would not be awarded for the sake of fairness, due to the limited nature of the competitions.

On July 13, the Japan Skating Federation announced that it would not assign any skaters to the Challenger Series, assuming the competitions proceeded as scheduled.

On August 25, the German Ice Skating Union confirmed that 2020 Nebelhorn Trophy would be held as scheduled, but without spectators and would include extensive social distancing guidelines and procedures for the athletes and coaches in attendance.

On August 28, the ISU removed the maximum entry limit per country of three skaters/teams per discipline.

As of November 4, the 2020 Golden Spin of Zagreb was postponed to an unspecified date.

Events 
The 2020–21 series will be composed of the following events in autumn 2020.

Cancelled 

 May 16: The ISU announced that the Slovak Figure Skating Association had cancelled the 2020 Nepela Memorial, scheduled for September 16–19 in Bratislava, Slovakia.
 August 20: The Finnish Figure Skating Association cancelled the 2020 Finlandia Trophy, but mentioned that they were willing to host the competition virtually.
 September 1: The 2020 Denis Ten Memorial Challenge was cancelled.
 November 3: Skate Austria cancelled the 2020 Cup of Tyrol.
 November 6: The ice dance portion of the 2020 Warsaw Cup is cancelled.
 November 10: The Polish Figure Skating Association cancels 2020 Warsaw Cup entirely.
 February 13: The 2020 Autumn Classic, originally listed as postponed and since removed from the official Skate Canada calendar, is referred to as cancelled.

Medal summary

Medalists

Men

Ladies

Pairs

Ice dance

Medal standings

Challenger Series rankings 
Out of fairness to skaters impacted by travel restrictions imposed by the COVID-19 pandemic, the ISU Council decided there will be no Challenger Series ranking this season and therefore no ISU prize money for the series will be awarded.

Top scores

Men

Best total score

Best short program score

Best free skating score

Ladies

Best total score

Best short program score

Best free skating score

Pairs

Best total score

Best short program score

Best free skating score

Ice dance

Best total score

Best rhythm dance score

Best free dance score

References

External links
 ISU Challenger Series at the International Skating Union

 

ISU Challenger Series
Figure skating competitions
Challenger Series
ISU Challenger Series